Andrea Cola (born 9 June 1999 in Rome) is an Italian racing driver currently competing in the Lamborghini Super Trofeo Europe for Target Racing.

Career

Karting
He began racing in 2009, when he was 10 years-old, practicing on karting. After gaining experience in the Italian Championship Regione Lazio in the 60 cc category in 2009 and 2010, he took part in the Italian Championship Regione Lazio 125 cc category junior in 2011 and 2012. In the 2012 championship he ranked second.

Single-seater racing
In June 2016 Andrea had his debut on F. Abarth in the F2 Italian Trophy with Monolite Racing (in the middle of the championship) at the Misano World Circuit getting the first place of his class in both races. He ranked second in the final standings of his class.

On 1 April 2017 he debuted in Formula 3 driving a F312 Dallara-Mercedes again on the Misano World Circuit. He retired in the last corner while he was second during Race 1 and ranked third in Race 2.

In 2017 he raced also in the Austria Formula 3 Cup, Afr Pokale and FIA CEZ Formula 3 championships. His first win in Formula 3 came in Race 2 on the Red Bull Ring circuit in Spielberg, Austria. Thanks to the good standings in the last two races on the Brno Circuit he won the FIA CEZ Formula 3 Championship 2017.

In 2018 he raced in the FIA CEZ Formula 3 Championship again. He ranked first in his category in the first two races of the season at the Hungaroring on 28 and 29 April. At the Red Bull Ring circuit, the second round of the season, he ranked third in Race 1 and second in Race 2, behind Jo Zeller Racing driver Sandro Zeller who won both races. Cola managed to win the 2018 Championship by scoring 154.5 points, 27 more than Paolo Brajnik, while another Italian racer, Ricardo Perego, got the third place.

In 2019, he is again defending his title in the FIA CEZ Formula 3 Championship, on his F312 Dallara now motorized Volkswagen.

Racing record

Career summary

References

External links 
 
 Andrea Cola official website

1999 births
Living people
Italian racing drivers
Racing drivers from Rome
Formula Regional European Championship drivers
Monolite Racing drivers
Euronova Racing drivers
Austrian Formula Three Championship drivers
Target Racing drivers
Lamborghini Super Trofeo drivers
Boutsen Ginion Racing drivers